The 2019–20 season was Racing Club de Strasbourg Alsace's third season since its return to the top flight of French football. In addition to the domestic league, Strasbourg participated in this season's editions of the Coupe de France, the Coupe de la Ligue, and the UEFA Europa League. The season covered the period from 1 July 2019 to 30 June 2020.

Players

Current squad

Out on loan

Pre-season and friendlies

Competitions

Overview

Ligue 1

League table

Results summary

Results by round

Matches
The Ligue 1 schedule was announced on 14 June 2019. The Ligue 1 matches were suspended by the LFP on 13 March 2020 due to COVID-19 until further notices. On 28 April 2020, it was announced that Ligue 1 and Ligue 2 campaigns would not resume, after the country banned all sporting events until September. On 30 April, The LFP ended officially the 2019–20 season.

Coupe de France

Coupe de la Ligue

UEFA Europa League

Second qualifying round

Third qualifying round

Play-off round

Statistics

Appearances and goals

|-
! colspan="14" style="background:#dcdcdc; text-align:center"| Goalkeepers

|-
! colspan="14" style="background:#dcdcdc; text-align:center"| Defenders

|-
! colspan="14" style="background:#dcdcdc; text-align:center"| Midfielders

|-
! colspan="14" style="background:#dcdcdc; text-align:center"| Forwards

|-
! colspan="14" style="background:#dcdcdc; text-align:center"| Players transferred out during the season

References

RC Strasbourg Alsace seasons
Strasbourg